DMB NEVOD, a product of RELEX Group, created in 1996, is an object-oriented repository with possibility of search and analysis of structured information (doing ad hoc inquiries and semantic net visualization). It is used mainly by security services of commercial organisations and divisions of the Ministry of Internal Affairs of the Russian Federation.

References

External links
 Official site of RELEX Group

Data modeling
Business software for Windows

ru:НЕВОД